Abbie Jean MacPherson (May 18, 1886 – August 26, 1946) was an American silent actress, writer, and director. MacPherson worked as a theater and film actress before becoming a screenwriter for Cecil B. DeMille. She was a pioneer for women in the film industry. She worked with D. W. Griffith and Cecil B. DeMille, two of the foremost filmmakers of the time.

Early life
Abbie Jean MacPherson was born in Boston, Massachusetts to a wealthy family of Spanish, Scottish, and French descent. Her parents were John S. MacPherson and Evangeline C. Tomlinson. As a teenager, she was sent to Mademoiselle DeJacque's school in Paris, but soon returned to the United States when her family could no longer afford the fees.

In the United States, MacPherson finished her degree at the Kenwood Institute in Chicago as she started her career as a dancer and stage performer. MacPherson began her theatrical career as part of the chorus in the Chicago Opera House. Over the next few years, she took singing lessons and any theater-related jobs she could find. She soon became interested in film.

Film career
She made her film debut in 1908 with a short film, The Fatal Hour, directed by D. W. Griffith. For the next year, she acted in many controversial roles in which she portrayed ethnicities other than her own. MacPherson had dark hair, so she was often cast in Romani or Spanish roles. From 1908 to 1917, she amassed 146 acting credits. She saw her time with Griffith as her "first glimmer of the possibilities in the new industry [and] from those days on [she had] seen a variety of attitudes toward the scriptwriters."

After Griffith, she went to the Universal Company and became a leading lady. She got her first significant opportunity in 1913, when she wrote, directed, and starred in The Tarantula (1913). She played the role of a Spanish-Mexican girl, known as the tarantula, who would infatuate men, get bored with them, and kill them with a bite. With this film, she became the youngest director in motion picture history. The Tarantula was her first and last experience as a director.  

She continued at the Universal Company for two years until her health caused her to break from the company. Upon her recovery, she found herself at Lasky Studios; however, she quickly sought out Cecil B. DeMille to see if she could act in his films. He told her, "I am not interested in star MacPherson, but I am in writer MacPherson"; from that point on, she focused on writing. 

DeMille and MacPherson formed one of the industry's most influential and long-lasting partnerships. She penned 30 of DeMille's next 34 films. Some of their most notable works are Rose of the Rancho (1914) with Bessie Barriscale, The Girl of the Golden West with Mabel Van Buren, The Cheat (1915) with Sessue Hayakawa, The Golden Chance (1915) with Wallace Reid, Joan the Woman (1916) with Geraldine Farrar, A Romance of the Redwoods (1917) with Mary Pickford, The Little American again with Pickford, and The Woman God Forgot (1917) again with Farrar.

In 1921, MacPherson told a reporter, "I shall always be grateful for Mr. DeMille's assistance. He is a hard taskmaster, and he demands that a thing shall be perfect... It was hard, but it taught me that anything worth doing at all was worth doing perfectly."

She believed that motion picture owed its psychology to D. W. Griffith and its dramatic picture scenario construction to DeMille. In 1927, she was one of the Academy of Motion Picture Arts and Sciences founding members.

Personal life
MacPherson and DeMille's relationship was met with speculation for years. DeMille's niece, Agnes de Mille, later confirmed that MacPherson was one of her uncle's three mistresses.

She was a pilot and sought to take daily flights. She was the only woman to pilot the plane of the late Lieutenant Locklear.

In 1946, MacPherson became ill with cancer while researching Unconquered (1947), a historical drama, and had to stop work. She died that August in Los Angeles at age 60 and was buried at the Hollywood Forever Cemetery in Hollywood. She was awarded a star on the Hollywood Walk of Fame at 6150 Hollywood Blvd.

Selected filmography 

Fra Diavolo (1933) (adaptation)
 Madam Satan (1930)
 Dynamite (1929)
 Young April (1926) (adaptation)
 Her Man o' War (1926)
 Red Dice (1926) (adaptation)
 The Road to Yesterday (1925) (adaptation)
 Triumph (1924) (adaptation)
 Adam's Rib (1923)
 Manslaughter (1922) (adaptation)
 Saturday Night (1922) 
 A Prodigal Knight (1921)
 Forbidden Fruit (1921)
 Male and Female (1919)
 Till I Come Back to You (1918)
 Old Wives for New (1918)
 The Devil-Stone (1917)
 The Woman God Forgot (1917)
 The Little American (1917)
 The Love Mask (1916)
 The Golden Chance (1915)
 Chimmie Fadden Out West (1915)
 The Black Box (1915)
 Fisher Folks (1911)
 A Mohawk's Way (1910) as Indian
 Schneider's Anti-Noise Crusade (1909) as maid

References

External links

 Jeanie MacPherson at the Women Film Pioneers Project
Jeanie MacPherson at Virtual History
 

1886 births
1946 deaths
20th-century American actresses
Academy of Motion Picture Arts and Sciences founders
American film actresses
American silent film actresses
Screenwriters from Massachusetts
Burials at Hollywood Forever Cemetery
Actresses from Boston
American women screenwriters
Deaths from cancer in California
American people of Scottish descent
American people of Spanish descent
American people of French descent
Writers from Boston
Women film pioneers
20th-century American women writers
20th-century American screenwriters